Afjan (also Romanized as Āfjān and Afjān; also known as Āfchūn, Afshūn, and Apihūn) is a village in Karvan-e Sofla Rural District, Karvan District, Tiran and Karvan County, Isfahan Province, Iran. At the 2006 census, its population was 1,572, in 407 families.

References 

Populated places in Tiran and Karvan County